Bhubaneswar Lok Sabha Constituency is one of the 21 Lok Sabha (Parliamentary) Constituencies in Odisha state in eastern India.

Assembly segments
Assembly Constituencies which constitute this Parliamentary Constituency, after delimitation of Parliamentary Constituencies and Legislative Assembly Constituencies of 2008 are:

Assembly Constituencies which constituted this Parliamentary Constituency, before delimitation of Parliamentary Constituencies and Legislative Assembly Constituencies of 2008 are:
Bhubaneswar
Jatni
Khurda
Begunia
Nayagarh
Khandapara
Daspalla

Members of Parliament
1952: Pandit Lingraj Mishra, Congress ( as Khurda seat )
1957: Nrusinha Charan Samantasinhar, Congress
1962: Raja P. C. Deo Bhanj, Congress
1967: Chintamani Panigrahi, Congress
1971: Chintamani Panigrahi, Congress
1977: Sivaji Patnaik, CPI (M)
1980: Chintamani Panigrahi, Congress
1984: Chintamani Panigrahi, Congress
1989: Sivaji Patnaik, CPI (M)
1991: Sivaji Patnaik, CPI (M)
1996: Soumya Ranjan Patnaik, Congress
1998: Prasanna Kumar Patasani, Biju Janata Dal
1999: Prasanna Kumar Patasani, Biju Janata Dal
2004: Prasanna Kumar Patasani, Biju Janata Dal
2009: Prasanna Kumar Patasani, Biju Janata Dal
2014: Prasanna Kumar Patasani, Biju Janata Dal
2019: Aparajita Sarangi, Bharatiya Janata Party

Election results

General Election 2019

General Election 2014
In 2014 election, Biju Janata Dal candidate Prasanna Kumar Patasani defeated Bharatiya Janata Party candidate Pruthwiraj Harichandan by a margin of 1,89,477 votes.

General Election 2009

References

Lok Sabha constituencies in Odisha
Khordha district